The 2016–17 Texas–Rio Grande Valley Vaqueros men's basketball team represented the University of Texas Rio Grande Valley during the 2016–17 NCAA Division I men's basketball season. The Vaqueros, led by first-year head coach Lew Hill, played their home games at the UTRGV Fieldhouse as members of the Western Athletic Conference. They finished the regular season 10–22, 2–12 in WAC play to finish in seventh place. Due to Grand Canyon's ineligibility for postseason play, they received the No. 6 seed in the WAC tournament where they lost in the quarterfinals to UMKC.

Previous season 
The Vaqueros finished the 2015–16 season 8–22, 4–10 in WAC play to finish in a tie for sixth place. They lost in the quarterfinals of the WAC tournament to Seattle.

On March 15, 2016, the school removed Dan Hipsher as head coach. On March 31, the school hired Lew Hill as head coach.

Offseason

Departures

Incoming transfers

2016 incoming recruits

Roster

Schedule and results 

|-
!colspan=9 style=| Exhibition

|-
!colspan=9 style=| Non-conference regular season

|-
!colspan=9 style=|WAC regular season

|-
!colspan=9 style=| WAC tournament

See also 
 2016–17 Texas–Rio Grande Valley Vaqueros women's basketball team

References 

UT Rio Grande Valley Vaqueros men's basketball seasons
UTRGV